Max Doerner (1 April 1870 in Burghausen – 1 March 1939 in Munich) was a German artist and art theorist.

Doerner's artistic education was at the Academy of Fine Arts Munich where he studied under Johann Caspar Herterich and Wilhelm von Diez. His style was impressionistic. He travelled around Europe, in particular to the Low Countries and Italy, and studied the old techniques of painting. He is most noted for his work The Materials of the Artist and Their Use in Painting, first published in 1921.

His approach inspired the founding of the Doerner Institute.

He was also an instructor at the Munich Academy, where his students included Karl Gatermann the Younger.

See also
 List of German painters
 Mischtechnik

References

External links
 

19th-century German painters
19th-century German male artists
German male painters
20th-century German painters
20th-century German male artists
1870 births
1939 deaths
German art educators
People from Burghausen, Altötting